Polystilifera is an suborder of worms belonging to the order Hoplonemertea.

Families:
 Armaueriidae
 Balaenanemertidae
 Brinkmanniidae
 Buergeriellidae
 Chuniellidae
 Dinonemertidae
 Drepanobandidae
 Drepanogigantidae
 Drepanophorellidae
 Drepanophoridae
 Drepanophoringiidae
 Nectonemertidae
 Pachynemertidae
 Paradrepanophoridae
 Pelagonemertidae
 Phallonemertidae
 Planktonemertidae
 Protopelagonemertidae
 Siboganemertidae
 Uniporidae

References

 
Hoplonemertea